Morris William "Dusty" Kline (January 18, 1898 – September 12, 1966) was an American football player and coach. He served as the first head football coach at Boise Junior College—now Boise State University—coaching one season in 1933 and compiling a record of 1–2–1.

A native of Plainfield, New Jersey, Kline played college football at the University of Idaho as a center. In 1929, Kline was coaching football at Rupert High School in Rupert, Idaho. In 1934, he was coaching at Boise High School. Kline moved to Baker, Oregon in 1943 to become a purchasing agent for Baker War Industries, Inc. A year later, he was hired as football coach at Baker High School.

Kline entered the real estate business in the 1950s. He died on September 12, 1966, at a hospital in Portland, Oregon.

Head coaching record

Junior college

References

External links
 

1898 births
1966 deaths
American football centers
Boise State Broncos football coaches
Idaho Vandals football players
High school football coaches in Idaho
High school football coaches in Oregon
People from Minidoka County, Idaho
People from Rupert, Idaho
Sportspeople from Plainfield, New Jersey
Coaches of American football from New Jersey
Players of American football from New Jersey